Spaun may refer to:

Hermann von Spaun (1833–1919), admiral in the Austro-Hungarian Navy
J. J. Spaun (born 1990), better known as "J.J.", American professional golfer
Joseph von Spaun (1788–1865), Austrian nobleman, an Imperial and Royal Councillor
SMS Admiral Spaun, scout cruiser built for the Austro-Hungarian Navy
Spaun (Semantic Pointer Architecture Unified Network), a cognitive architecture